Sir Charles Carrick Allom (1865–1947) was an eminent English decorator, trained as an architect and knighted for his work on Buckingham Palace. He was the grandson of architect Thomas Allom and painter Thomas Carrick. Among his American clients in the years preceding World War I was Henry Clay Frick, for whom Allom furnished houses in cooperation with Sir Joseph Duveen, the eminent paintings dealer. Allom furnished the Henry Clay Frick House at 71st Street and Fifth Avenue which today houses the Frick Collection, and the neo-Georgian house, Clayton, in Roslyn, Long Island, designed by Ogden Codman Jr., that was bought for Frick's daughter-in-law. For the grand rooms of parade in Frick's New York house, Sir Charles, whose London workshops produced the plasterwork and boiseries, kept the furnishings muted, not to compete with Frick's collection of paintings. In 1925, when William Randolph Hearst purchased a real castle, St. Donat's in Wales, his choice to furnish it fell upon Sir Charles.

Biography
In 1914, Allom and Charles Ernest Nicholson of Camper and Nicholsons, a boat-building firm, formed the Gosport Aircraft Company. The firm built a number of flying-boats for the British government and proposed a series of designs during 1919. The venture closed in 1920 following the death of its chief designer, flying boat pioneer John Cyril Porte. 

Shortly after World War I, Allom decided that he needed a more prominent position in New York. He purchased the house on Madison Avenue built by Carrère and Hastings in 1893 for Dr. Christian Herter which the firm White, Allom & Company occupied until 1933. Allom divided his time between London and New York. Returning to London from one of his trans-Atlantic trips in 1925, Sir Charles remarked on the American work ethic and was quoted in Time magazine. In 1931, White, Allom was among the stellar cast of furnishers and decorators creating a grand but homey atmosphere for the new Waldorf-Astoria Hotel on Park Avenue.

The style generated by Allom, White was distinctly old-fashioned. It appealed to Queen Mary, who was a connoisseur of eighteenth-century English porcelain and furniture. And when the Empress of Britain was launched the same year as the "new" Waldorf-Astoria, among its modern Art Deco decors, the "Mayfair Lounge" by White, Allom was the one space in Edwardian Renaissance manner.

He died in 1947.

Legacy
White Allom was acquired by Holloway as Holloway White Allom in 1960.

Notes

-White & Allom also were commissioned by the Huntington’s at “San Marino”at Pasadena CA
The Dining Room mantle and upper mantle are what’s left of their finger prints albeit painted out all Navaho white.  

-White, Allom’s most outstanding work was “Whitemarsh Hall”E.T. Stotesbury/Eva Roberts Cromwell Stotesbury at Wynmoor/Chestnut Hill, Philadelphia suburb. Outstanding photographs exist on line. Most photographed house in the USA at the time.   
Their further work near by at Cheltenham “Lynnwood Hall” owed by the Widner Family.
Charles Currick Allom worked with Sir Joseph Duveen, Horace Trumbuer, and Landscape designer extraordinare Jacque Grabier.
Fans of Whitemarsh Hall on Facebook.  Charles Currick Allom is alive and well regarded an hundred years later. Whitemarsh Hall opened October 21, 1921. 
I believe the Stotesbury Job was his most prolific work. Check out the hand made upper mantles in the primary rooms at Whitemarsh Hall. Many were antique and salvaged from torn down London Town houses. 
Sources:
“Twilight of Splendor”
“Grand Dame’s”

Further reading
Bailey, Colin B. Building the Frick Collection: An Introduction to the House and Its Collections

1865 births
1947 deaths
English interior designers
Knights Bachelor